Jérémy Aicardi (born 26 November 1988) is a French rugby sevens player. He was selected for the French sevens team for the 2016 Summer Olympics in Brazil.

References

External links 
 
 
 
 
 

1988 births
Living people
Male rugby sevens players
Rugby sevens players at the 2016 Summer Olympics
Olympic rugby sevens players of France
France international rugby sevens players
Sportspeople from Nice